Phrynocris notabilis is a species of beetle in the family Cerambycidae, the only species in the genus Phrynocris. The species was originally described by Henry Walter Bates in 1867.

Description 
Phrynocris notabilis is a beetle that is primarily found in the northern part of South America.

Range 
The species have been observed in French Guiana and Brazil

Taxonomy 
Phrynocris notabilis  is a Monotypic taxon which was described in 1867.

References

Hesperophanini